Stephanopachys cribratus is a species of horned powder-post beetle in the family Bostrichidae. It is found in North America, particularly east of the Rocky Mountains. It is dark brown and typically between 3.5 and 5.0 mm long.

References

Further reading

External links

 

Bostrichidae
Articles created by Qbugbot
Beetles described in 1866